Jili was a leader of the Predynastic Zhou during the Shang dynasty of ancient China. His son King Wen and grandson King Wu would defeat the Shang to establish the Zhou dynasty. He was posthumously granted the title of king, and often referred to as Ji, King of Zhou.

Jili's ancestral name was Ji. He was the youngest son of King Tai. Sima Qian recorded that Jili and his son were both renowned for their wisdom and this reputation caused his elder brothers Taibo and Zhongyong to renounce voluntarily their claims to the throne and to leave in exile to Wu.

Surviving historical records portray him travelling to the Shang capital to submit to Wu Yi and being rewarded with land, jade, and horses in 1118 BC. In 1117, he captured 20 "kings" of the Guirong tribes. During the reign of the Shang king Wen Ding, he was defeated by the Yanjing Rong but managed to subdue the Yuwu, Hu, and Xitu Rong. After the defeat of the Xitu tribe, Wen Ding became nervous and betrayed him, rewarding him richly before dispatching him to a place called Saiku, where he was killed by Shang forces. Jili's death caused his son Ji Chang to harbor hatred towards the Shang; as the Zhou were still weak and must serve the Shang, Ji Chang plotted revenge.

Jili's wife was Tai Ren. Tai Ren, along with Jiang Yuan (mother of Jili's paternal ancestor Hou Ji), were credited by Sima Qian as two women responsible for the success of the Zhou. She came from a place called Zhi and represented some connection to the Shang royalty.

Jili had at least three sons. The eldest son was King Wen, whose son King Wu established the Zhou dynasty of China upon defeating the Shang at the Battle of Muye.

References

Zhou dynasty kings
Shang dynasty people
12th-century BC Chinese monarchs